Lucilla Mary Wright (born 24 December 1979 in Birmingham, West Midlands) is a female former English field hockey international.

Hockey career
Wright was a member of the England and Great Britain women's field hockey teams during the late 1990s and 2000s.

She represented England and won a silver medal, at the 1998 Commonwealth Games in Kuala Lumpur, Malaysia. Four years later she won a second silver medal at the 2002 Commonwealth Games and won a bronze medal in 2006. She played for Olton & West Warwickshire Hockey Club.

References

External links
 

1979 births
English female field hockey players
Living people
Olympic field hockey players of Great Britain
Field hockey players at the 1998 Commonwealth Games
Field hockey players at the 2000 Summer Olympics
Field hockey players at the 2002 Commonwealth Games
Field hockey players at the 2006 Commonwealth Games
Field hockey players at the 2008 Summer Olympics
Commonwealth Games silver medallists for England
Commonwealth Games bronze medallists for England
Alumni of Aston University
People educated at Bromsgrove School
British podiatrists
Sportspeople from Birmingham, West Midlands
Commonwealth Games medallists in field hockey
Medallists at the 1998 Commonwealth Games
Medallists at the 2006 Commonwealth Games